An epistolary poem, also called a verse letter or letter poem, is a poem in the form of an epistle or letter.

History
Epistolary poems date at least as early as the Roman poet Ovid (43 BC – 17 or 18 AD), who wrote the Heroides (The Heroines) or Epistulae Heroidum (Letters of Heroines), a collection of fifteen epistolary poems presented as though written by a selection of aggrieved heroines of Greek and Roman mythology, addressing their heroic lovers who have in some way mistreated, neglected, or abandoned them.  Ovid extended this with the Double Heroides consisting of three separate exchanges of paired epistles, one each from a heroic lover to his absent beloved and from the heroine in return.

A number of epistolary poems were published as separate works in England during the so-called "Long Eighteenth Century", i.e., about 1688 – 1815.

Examples

Examples of epistolary poems include:

 Fridugisus (8th century)
 Baldric of Dol (c. 1050 – 1130)
 William Pittis & Nahum Tate, An epistolary poem to N. Tate, Esquire, and poet laureat to His Majesty, occasioned by the taking of Namur, London,  R. Baldwin, 1696
 William Pittis, An epistolary poem to John Dryden, Esq: occasion'd by the much lamented death of the Right Honourable James Earl of Abingdon, London, H. Walwyn, 1699.
 Ricard Butler, A.M., British Michael: an epistolary poem, to a friend in the country, London, J. Matthews,  1710.	
 James Belcher, A cat may look upon a king: An epistolary poem, on the loss of the ears of a favourite female cat, Dublin, 1732.
T R;  Charles Cathcart, Lord,  An epistolary poem to a lady on the present expedition of Lord Cathcart, London, Olive Payne, 1740. 						
George Canning,  An epistolary poem: supposed to be written by Lord William Russell, to Lord William Cavendish; from the prison of Newgate, ... the 20th of July, 1683, in the evening before the execution of that virtuous and patriotic nobleman, ... under the false pretext of his being concerned in the pretended ..., London,  R. H. Westley, 1793.
 The conduct of man. A didactic epistolary poem, London, C. Chapple,  1811.

See also

Epistolary novel
Letter collection

References

Genres of poetry
Letters (message)